Fyllinge was a locality situated in Halmstad Municipality, Halland County, Sweden, with 2,927 inhabitants in 2010. Since 2015 the locality is now counted by Statistics Sweden as part of Halmstad.

References 

Populated places in Halmstad Municipality